Satini is both a given name and a surname. Notable people with the name include:

Satini Manuella (born 1958), Tuvaluan politician
Tony Satini (born 1993), Tongan rugby league footballer

See also
Santini, a surname